Dick Divall (born 27 February 1926) was a Bermudian sailor. He competed in the Flying Dutchman event at the 1960 Summer Olympics.

References

External links
 

1926 births
Possibly living people
Bermudian male sailors (sport)
Olympic sailors of Bermuda
Sailors at the 1960 Summer Olympics – Flying Dutchman
People from Paget Parish